John Patten is the name of:

John Patten (American politician) (1746–1800), American soldier and politician from Delaware
Jack Patten (1905–1957), Australian Aboriginal civil rights leader and journalist
Johnny Jarrett (born John Patten, 1936), Australian Aboriginal boxer and community leader
John Patten, Baron Patten (born 1945), British Conservative politician

See also
John Paton (disambiguation)
John Patton (disambiguation)